Louis D'Angelo (May 6, 1888 – August 9, 1958) was an American bass-baritone of Italian birth who was particularly known for his performances at the Metropolitan Opera during the first half of the 20th century. He created roles in the world premieres of seven operas at the Met, including Marco in Puccini's Gianni Schicchi in 1917.

D'Angelo also sang roles in the United States premieres of thirteen works. In total, he appeared in 1,882 performances at the Met.

He sang a broad repertoire of more than 300 roles at the Met ranging from leading roles to comprimario parts. His voice was recorded for several Metropolitan Opera radio broadcasts, and on several complete opera recordings made by the Met for Naxos Records.

Early life and career
D'Angelo was born on May 6, 1888 in Naples, Italy. With his family he moved to the United States at the age of three. He was trained in the United States and began his career as a leading baritone with the Century Opera Company in 1914. He made his debut with that company as Macroton in L'amore medico. Other roles he sang at the Century Opera House included Silvio in Pagliacci, Baron Douphol in La traviata, Kagama in Natoma, and Yamadori in Madama Butterfly.

Work with the Metropolitan Opera
From 1917–1948 D'Angelo was a performer with the Metropolitan Opera in New York City where he appeared in a total of 1,882 performances. He made his debut with the Met at the Brooklyn Academy of Music as Sciarrone in Tosca with Geraldine Farrar in the title role on November 13, 1917. His first performance at the "Old Met" was on November 17, 1917 as Wagner in Faust with Giovanni Martinelli as the eponymous hero.

World premiere roles
D'Angelo created roles in several world premieres at the Met, including:

 Marco in Puccini's Gianni Schicchi (1917)
 Count Stackareff in The Legend (1919)
 The Roman Officer in Cleopatra's Night (1920)
 Ordgar in The King's Henchman (1927)
 The Chaplain in Peter Ibbetson (1931)
 Praise God Tewke in Merry Mount (1934)
 Both Commodore Stephen Decatur and Sergeant O'Neil in The Man Without a Country (1937)

Singing roles in U.S. premieres
At the Met he also sang roles in the United States premieres of thirteen works, including:

 The Captain in Eugene Onegin (1920)
 Niclas in Karel Weis' Der Polnische Jude (1921)
 Bermiyta in The Snow Maiden (1922)
 Masolino in Mona Lisa (1923)
 Uncle in Primo Riccitelli's I Compagnacci (1924)
 Tornaquinci in La cena delle beffe (1926)
 Tío Salvaor in La vida breve (1926)
 The Count in Franco Alfano's Madonna Imperia (1928)
 The Schoolmaster in La campana sommersa (1928)
 Squint-Eye in Fra Gherardo (1929)
 Duda in Sadko (1930)
 Lyoval in La notte di Zoraima (1931)
 Both Tommati and the Innkeeper in Caponsacchi (1937)

First stagings at the Met
D'Angelo also performed roles in the Met's first stagings of several operas, including:

 Marquis de Calatrava in La forza del destino (1918)
 Harun al Raschid in Oberon (1918)
 Courtois Zazà (1920)
 The Grand Inquisitor in Don Carlos (1920)
 The Junkman in Louise (1921)
 Dumas in Andrea Chénier (1921)
 A Blind Man in La Habanera (1924)
 A Bandit in Don Quichotte (1926)
 Sir Douglas in Donna Juanita (1932)
 Uberto in La serva padrona (1935)
 Geronimo in Il matrimonio segreto (1937)

Other roles
Other roles he performed for the company included:

 Abimélech in Samson et Dalila
 Alcindoro, Benoit, and Schaunard in La bohème
 Bartolo in The Barber of Seville
 Bonze in Madama Butterfly
 Crespel and Spalanzani in The Tales of Hoffmann
 The Duke of Verona in Roméo et Juliette
 The Innkeeper in Manon
 Kecal in The Bartered Bride
 The King of Egypt in Aida
 The Monk in La Gioconda
 Nachtigall in Die Meistersinger von Nürnberg
 Reinmar in Tannhäuser
 Roustan in Madame Sans-Gêne
 The Second Knight in Parsifal
 The Steersman in Tristan und Isolde
 The Sultan in Mârouf, savetier du Caire
 Zuniga in Carmen (among many others)

Final appearance
His last appearance at the Metropolitan Opera was on February 15, 1948 as Grenvil in La traviata.

Death and legacy
D'Angelo died on August 9, 1958 at Jersey City, New Jersey, aged 70. He sang an extensive repertoire of more than 300 roles in a total of 1,882 performances at the Metropolitan Opera. A 1927 recording of his "Excerpt from Act IV of La Juive," accompanying tenor Giovanni Martinelli, is credited in the 2013 film The Immigrant.

Recordings
Georges Bizet, Carmen, Metropolitan Opera Orchestra and Chorus, conducted by Wilfrid Pelletier, Gladys Swarthout, Charles Kullman, Licia Albanese (1941, Naxos) 
Gustave Charpentier, Louise, Metropolitan Opera Orchestra and Chorus, conducted by Thomas Beecham, Grace Moore, Raoul Jobin, Ezio Pinza (1943, Naxos)
Charles Gounod, Roméo et Juliette, Metropolitan Opera Orchestra and Chorus, conducted by Louis Hasselmans, Charles Hackett, Eidé Norena, Angelo Bada (1935, Naxos)
Howard Hanson, Merry Mount, Metropolitan Opera Orchestra and Chorus, conducted by Tullio Serafin, Lawrence Tibbett, Göta Ljungberg, Gladys Swarthout (1934, Naxos)
Wolfgang Amadeus Mozart, Don Giovanni, Metropolitan Opera Orchestra and Chorus, conducted by Tullio Serafin, Ezio Pinza, Virgilio Lazzari, Rosa Ponselle (1934, Andromeda)
Wolfgang Amadeus Mozart, The Marriage of Figaro, Metropolitan Opera Orchestra and Chorus, conducted by Paul Breisach, Ezio Pinza, Bidu Sayão, John Brownlee (Guild Historical,1943)
Bedřich Smetana, The Bartered Bride, Metropolitan Opera Orchestra and Chorus, conducted by Wilfrid Pelletier, Hilda Burke, Mario Chamlee, George Rasely (1937, Bensar Records)
Giuseppe Verdi, La traviata, Metropolitan Opera Orchestra and Chorus, conducted by Ettore Panizza, Jarmila Novotná, Jan Peerce, Lawrence Tibbett (Myto, 1941)
Giuseppe Verdi, Simon Boccanegra, Metropolitan Opera Orchestra and Chorus, conducted by Ettore Panizza, Lawrence Tibbett, Elisabeth Rethberg, Giovanni Martinelli (1939, MET)

References

External links

1888 births
1958 deaths
American operatic bass-baritones
Italian emigrants to the United States
Musicians from Naples
20th-century American male opera singers